Güneşli is a village in the Adıyaman District, Adıyaman Province, Turkey. Its population is 209 (2021).

The hamlet of Ordu is attached to the village. Ordu is populated by Kurds of the Reşwan tribe.

References

Villages in Adıyaman District

Kurdish settlements in Adıyaman Province